Brînduşa Armanca (born 1954)  is a Romanian academic and journalist. Holding a PhD in Philology, she has taught journalism at the Aurel Vlaicu University of Arad, West University of Timișoara and Lucian Blaga University of Sibiu and is the author of six books on journalism.

A former manager of TVR Timișoara (1997–2004), a regional studio of the public television, she was the editorial director of the Ziua daily in Bucharest, the president of Videovest Association, and board member of Transparency International Romania. Armanca holds many awards for TV documentaries and journalism. From October 2006 she is the director of the Romanian Cultural Institute in Budapest, and from 2010 to 2011 held the presidency of the European Union National Institutes for Culture.

Law suit against TVR 
In August 2007, after a two-year legal battle Armanca won her lawsuit against TVR. Armanca had been fired from TVR after publicly arguing that TVR's terms of employment violated the constitution and European Convention on Human Rights. After this incident the US State Department reported that media watchdog groups had called for a reconsideration of state TV's policies which had been found to be restricting the right of its employees to freely  express themselves and interfering with the public nature of the TVR as an institution.

References

External links
Author's website
Aurel Vlaicu University of Arad:Department of Modern Languages and Social and Human Sciences - Faculty -Brînduşa Armanca's CV (Accessed April 2012)

1954 births
Living people
Romanian journalists
Romanian women journalists
Academic staff of the Lucian Blaga University of Sibiu
Academic staff of the Aurel Vlaicu University of Arad
Academic staff of the West University of Timișoara